Frank Hunter and Elizabeth Ryan defeated the defending champions Leslie Godfree and Kitty Godfree in the final, 8–6, 6–0 to win the mixed doubles tennis title at the 1927 Wimbledon Championships.

Seeds

  Leslie Godfree /  Kitty Godfree (final)
  Jean Borotra /  Marguerite Bordes (second round)
  Frank Hunter /  Elizabeth Ryan (champions)
  Bill Tilden /  Molla Mallory (second round)

Draw

Finals

Top half

Section 1

Section 2

Bottom half

Section 3

The nationality of Mrs DM Evans is unknown.

Section 4

References

External links

X=Mixed Doubles
Wimbledon Championship by year – Mixed doubles